Jifar (Amharic: ጅፋር) or Jufar is a male name of Ethiopian origin that may refer to:

Tesfaye Jifar (born 1976), Ethiopian long-distance runner
Habte Jifar (born 1976), Ethiopian middle-distance runner
Tariku Jufar (born 1984), Ethiopian marathon runner
Abba Jifar I (fl. 1800s), first king of the Gibe Kingdom of Jimma (1830–1855)
Abba Jifar II (died 1932), King of the Gibe Kingdom of Jimma (1878–1932)

See also
Ja'far

Amharic-language names